Max "Tanque" Rauhofer (born 28 October 1990) is a Uruguayan footballer who currently plays for Cibao FC of the Liga Dominicana de Fútbol.

Career
Rauhofer began his professional career at age 14 with hometown club Deportivo Maldonado. He remained with the club until 2007 when he signed with Spanish club Albacete Balompié B, the reserve side of Albacete Balompié, that competed in the Tercera División. In 2010, Rauhofer returned to Uruguay and signed with Liverpool of the Uruguayan Primera División, the top tier of football in Uruguay. In total, Rauhofer made 26 appearances and scored 4 goals for Liverpool. After four years with the club Rauhofer transferred to Sud América, also of the Primera División, where he stayed for two seasons. During his time with the club, he tallied 2 goals in 20 league appearances. During his time in South America, Rauhofer competed in both the Copa Libertadores and the Copa Sudamericana.

On 15 April 2015, it was announced that Rauhofer had signed for Real Monarchs SLC, the reserve side of Real Salt Lake of Major League Soccer, that competed in the USL, the third tier of the United States soccer league system. It was announced that the player had already received his international transfer clearance and would be available for the club's next match, an away fixture at Colorado Springs Switchbacks FC two days later. Rauhofer went on to debut and score his first goal, a header off of a cross from Ricardo Velazco, in the eventual 2–5 defeat.

After a spell with Guillermo Brown, Rauhofer returned to the United States when he signed with Orange County Blues on 12 August 2016.

Personal
Rauhofer also holds Italian citizenship.

References

External links

Liverpool profile

1990 births
Living people
People from Maldonado Department
Uruguayan people of German descent
Association football forwards
Uruguayan footballers
Uruguayan expatriate footballers
Uruguayan Primera División players
USL Championship players
Uruguayan Segunda División players
Primera Nacional players
Liverpool F.C. (Montevideo) players
Sud América players
Guillermo Brown footballers
Deportivo Maldonado players
Tercera División players
Atlético Albacete players
Real Monarchs players
Orange County SC players
Cibao FC players
Uruguayan expatriate sportspeople in the United States
Uruguayan expatriate sportspeople in Argentina
Uruguayan expatriate sportspeople in Spain
Expatriate soccer players in the United States
Expatriate footballers in Argentina
Expatriate footballers in Spain